Jimmy Smith Lake is an alpine lake in Custer County, Idaho, United States, located at the northeast end of the White Cloud Mountains on the Bureau of Land Management land just east and downstream of the Sawtooth National Recreation Area border. The lake is accessed from trail 677, which is a  improved ATV trail along Big Lake Creek, but there is no motorized vehicle access beyond the lake.

Jimmy Smith Lake gives the appearance that it is a reservoir. However, it was formed by an ancient landslide. The lake is stocked with rainbow trout, which makes it a popular year-round fishing destination for locals. A dispersed camping area and vault toilet are located at the trailhead.

See also

 List of lakes of the White Cloud Mountains
 Sawtooth National Recreation Area
 White Cloud Mountains
 List of lakes in Idaho

References

Lakes of Idaho
Lakes of Custer County, Idaho
Sawtooth National Forest
Landslide-dammed lakes